"In Ha Mood" is a song by American rapper Ice Spice. It was released on January 6, 2023, through 10K Projects.

Background and release 
On December 21, 2022, Ice Spice first teased her single on a TikTok video, which amassed views from her fans. Four days later, Ice Spice premiered "In Ha Mood" on YouTube and SoundCloud.  That same day American rapper Chance the Rapper took to his Instagram story to question if the song's lyric: "He a rapper but don't get a chance" was a reference to him. Ice Spice later clarified that the lyrics were unrelated to the rapper.

Composition 
"In Ha Mood" was produced by RiotUSA, Ice Spice's regular producer. In the song, Ice Spice speaks about a man attempting to persuade her to stay with him, despite her desire to go to parties and enjoy herself. She also continues to flaunt her popularity when she steps out of her comfort zone.

Music video 
On January 16, 2023, she was seen recording the music video to "In Ha Mood" in The Bronx after initially planning to record the music video to her song "Gangsta Boo" with American rapper Lil Tjay which was interrupted by the latter's arrest during the video shoot. On January 28, 2023, she released the music video to her song. The video was directed by Oliver Cannon and Chris Villa. In it, the Bronx drill rapper can be seen cruising around New York in a Jeep and rapping along to the song while shooting a wintery promo.

Internet meme 
The internet meme featured Sparkles and Lily from Barbie and the Diamond Castle to This song and Check it out, it got its popularity in late February 2023, a format for example: “Me and my homies on our way to get some food from the fridge.”

Charts

References 

2023 songs
Ice Spice songs
Songs written by Ice Spice